Ilex reticulata is a species of plant in the family Aquifoliaceae. It is endemic to Guangxi province in China.

References

reticulata
Endemic flora of China
Flora of Guangxi
Critically endangered flora of Asia
Taxonomy articles created by Polbot